Goura, Phthiotis was a village located within Phthiotis, Greece. Sometime around the late 19th century, a beehive tomb burial structure constructed from stone was discovered in Goura. Local people converted the tomb into a lime kiln, and it contained rings, gold, silver, painted vases and bones.

See also
 List of settlements in Phthiotis

References

Populated places in Phthiotis
Lime kilns in Greece